The Lugano Tigers are a Swiss professional basketball club that is based in Lugano, Switzerland. The club competes in the Swiss Basketball League (SBL), the highest domestic tier. Founded as FN Lugano, the team was re-named to Lugano Snakes in 1999 and to its current name in 2003.

History
Founded in 1981, with the merging of Federal Lugano and AS Viganello, FV Lugano won the first Swiss Cup in 1982. In 1999, FV Lugano became the Lugano Snakes, the Snakes would go on to win three Swiss League championships, two Swiss Cups, and appear in the 2000-2001 EuroLeague. In 2003, financial failure would see the Snakes become the Tigers. Lugano Tigers would go on to win the Swiss League championship in 2006, and finish in second place in the next two seasons, before winning the Swiss League championship again in 2010. During the 2010–11 season, the Tigers would play in the 2010–11 FIBA EuroChallenge tournament, on their way to winning the Swiss national championship, Swiss Cup, and the Swiss League Cup.

Honours

 Swiss Basketball League: 8
2000, 2001, 2002, 2006, 2010, 2011, 2012, 2014
 Swiss Cup: 4
1982, 2001, 2002, 2011
 League Cup: 2
2011, 2012

European history
Boncourt made its debut in the European fourth-tier FIBA Europe Cup in the 2003–04 season and consequently would appear in the next three edition as well.

Notable players

 Dušan Mlađan
 Derek Stockalper
 Christophe Varidel
 Alon Stein
 Michael Efevberha
 Todd Mitchell
 Travis Walton
 Travis Watson

Head coaches
  Gianluca Barilari

External links 
Official Website 
Eurobasket.com Team Page

Basketball teams in Switzerland
Lugano
Sport in Ticino
Basketball teams established in 1981